Nebria cordicollis cordicollis is a subspecies of ground beetle in the Nebriinae subfamily that can be found in Italy and Switzerland.

References

cordicollis cordicollis
Beetles of Europe